Roberta Flack is a 1978 album release by American vocalist Roberta Flack: her eighth album release - including her 1972 Donny Hathaway collaboration - Roberta Flack was the parent album of the #1 Adult Contemporary hit "If Ever I See You Again" which also ranked in the Top 40.

Background
Since signing with Atlantic Records in 1968 Flack had overall abided by her original contract's terms of recording an album every two years: however her December 1977 album release Blue Lights in the Basement had been issued thirty-three months subsequent to Flack's precedent album Feel Like Makin' Love and in the spring of 1978 Atlantic Records president Jerry Greenberg insisted that Flack cut a new album to honor her contract, despite Flack's Blue Lights in the Basement album being a current release.

Greenberg was largely motivated by the prospect of having Flack record the theme song from the upcoming film If Ever I See You Again written by Joe Brooks and featured in the film which Brooks produced. Brooks' precedent film production You Light Up My Life had had its theme song via a recording by Debby Boone spend ten weeks at number 1 on the Billboard Hot 100.  Although Greenberg had responded warily to Brooks' pitch that Flack record the song "If Ever I See You Again" - plus some other songs heard in the film - for a new album despite Flack's Blue Lights in the Basement album being a current release, Brooks convinced Greenberg that the If Ever I See You Again theme would be "bigger than 'You Light Up My Life'...It will be a monster [hit]". Flack herself would eventually state that "If Ever I See You Again" was "a song I couldn't stand" which Greenberg insisted she record: (Roberta Flack quote:) "I had a very clever lawyer who made a huge money deal for [my recording] that song".

In April 1978 Brooks produced Flack at A&R Recording Studios (NYC) recording session which yielded Flack's recording of the theme from If Ever I See You Again plus two other songs heard in the film: "Come Share My Love" and "When It's Over". Flack recorded six more tracks to complete the album with Greenberg overseeing production at Atlantic Studios. Flack's recording of its theme from If Ever I See You Again was released 21 April 1978, a month prior to the film's premiere.

With the film If Ever I See You Again quickly proving a massive flop, Flack's single was left to fare on its own merit and in July 1978 spent three weeks at #1 on the Easy Listening chart with an eventual ranking as the #8 Easy Listening hit for the year. "If Ever I See You Again" charted at #24 on the Billboard Hot 100, and #37 on the R&B chart.

The projected title of Flack's seventh solo album release had been If Ever I See You Again referencing its lead single:. the single's underperformance was reflected in the album being released with the title Roberta Flack on 7 August 1978. Following the album's October 1978 Billboard 200 peak of #74 - as opposed to the #8 peak of Blue Lights in the Basement - Atlantic issued the two other Joe Brooks tracks on Roberta Flack: "Come Share My Love" and "When It's Over", as a single with the latter as A-side and no mention of the tracks' cinematic provenance: after this single essentially flopped - "When It's Over" reaching #82 on the R&B chart - Atlantic attempted to spur further interest in the album by releasing Flack's remake of the Stylistics' hit "You Are Everything" as a single in April 1979 - a year after the release of the "If Ever I See You Again" single, and the first time a third single had been culled from a Roberta Flack album - without result, the track barely making the R&B chart at #98.

Track listing

Personnel 
 Roberta Flack – lead and backing vocals, keyboards, arrangements
 Monty Alexander – keyboards
 Ronnie Foster – synthesizers
 Rob Mounsey – keyboards 
 Leon Pendarvis – keyboards, arrangements 
 Howard Schneider – keyboards
 Harry Whitaker – keyboards
 Hiram Bullock – guitars
 Reggie Lucas – guitars
 Hugh McCracken – guitars 
 Jeff Mironov – guitars
 Cliff Morris –  guitars
 David Spinozza – guitars
 Brian Allsop – bass
 Basil Fearrington – bass
 Anthony Jackson – bass 
 Steve Ferrone – drums
 Steve Gadd – drums
 Howard King – drums, backing vocals 
 Gary Mure – drums
 Larry Alexander – percussion, arrangements 
 Erroll "Crusher" Bennett – percussion 
 David Carey – percussion
 Warren Chiasson – percussion
 James Mtume – percussion
 Angelo DiBraccio – alto saxophone
 Sherry Winston – flute
 Joseph Brooks – arrangements and conductor (4, 7, 9)
 Frank Lloyd – backing vocals 
 Lani Groves – backing vocals
 Gwen Guthrie – backing vocals
 Tami Lester Smith – backing vocals
 Yvonne Lewis – backing vocals 
 Ullanda McCullough – backing vocals 
 Zachery Sanders – backing vocals 
 Luther Vandross – backing vocals
 Brenda White – backing vocals

Production 
 Joe Ferla – producer (1, 2, 3, 5, 6, 8), engineer (1, 2, 3, 5, 6, 8), remixing (1, 2, 3, 5, 6, 8)
 Rubina Flake – producer (1, 2, 3, 5, 6, 8)
 Joseph Brooks – producer (4, 7, 9)
 Jerry L. Greenberg – executive producer 
 Joe Lopes – engineer (1, 2, 3, 5, 6, 8)
 Tom Heid – additional engineer (1, 2, 3, 5, 6, 8)
 Jim McCurdy – additional engineer (1, 2, 3, 5, 6, 8)
 Malcolm Addey – engineer (4, 7, 9)
 Jack Adelman – mastering 
 Bob Defrin – art direction, design 
 Stewart Bosley – cover concept 
 Gazebo Group – cover concept
 Giuseppe Pino – photography

Studios 
 Recorded at RCA Studios, The Hit Factory, Atlantic Studios, A & R Recording and Sound Ideas Studios (New York City, New York).
 Mastered at A & R Recording.

References

Roberta Flack albums
1978 albums
Atlantic Records albums